Good Apollo, I'm Burning Star IV, Volume One: From Fear Through the Eyes of Madness is the third studio album by progressive rock quartet Coheed and Cambria. It was released on September 20, 2005, through Equal Vision Records and Columbia Records, and is the first release on a major label. It is the third installment of a projected tetralogy, as well as the final studio album to feature drummer Josh Eppard before his original departure. He was replaced by Chris Pennie who was with the band for their next two albums (although he did not record on No World for Tomorrow due to contractual obligations) before Eppard returned to the band in late 2011. On their previous album, In Keeping Secrets of Silent Earth: 3, the phrase "My dearest Apollo, I'll be burning Star IV" is written after the lyrics for the song "The Light & the Glass".

The album begins to resolve the issues of Claudio Kilgannon's quest to protect the Keywork, and sheds more light on the demise of Coheed and his wife Cambria. Also, it expands on the issues of the Monstar virus and Jesse's involvement in the saga. A graphic novel based upon the entire story of the album was released on the same day. This album, unlike the others, tells the story from the perspective of the author, known as The Writer, and the ways in which his life and personal demons affect his telling of the Amory Wars narrative.

The official site once hosted the third track and first single from the album, entitled "Welcome Home". This song is featured in the music video game Rock Band, and the trailer for the CGI animated movie 9. The band's Myspace and PureVolume had the second single from the album, entitled "The Suffering". The third single was "Ten Speed (of God's Blood & Burial)", released only as a video and never to radio.

Track listing

Notes
 "The Telling Truth" contains, at approximately 4:46, a reprise of "Blood Red Summer" from the previous Coheed and Cambria album, In Keeping Secrets of Silent Earth: 3. After that, the line "Jesse, bad boy, just come look at what your brother did" is a reference to "Everything Evil" from the band's first album, The Second Stage Turbine Blade.
 "The Final Cut" includes the hidden track "Bron Yr", at approximately 6:20 in, which is a tribute to Led Zeppelin, commonly mistaken as a cover of the Led Zeppelin song "Bron-Yr-Aur Stomp".

The Japanese pressing of the album contained a bonus track, "A Favor House Atlantic" from Live at the Starland Ballroom.
"Keeping the Blade" is the only track on the album to feature the time skip motif found on the previous two albums. It is played by string instruments.

Reception

The album was ranked number 69 in the October 2006 issue of Guitar World magazine's list of the greatest 100 guitar albums of all time. An acoustic version of "Wake Up" was featured on the Snakes on a Plane soundtrack.

The CD is Coheed and Cambria's greatest success to date selling over a million copies worldwide. It also received mostly positive reviews, getting a Metacritic score of 73 out of 100.

The album peaked at number 7 on the Billboard 200, selling over 500,000 copies, according to Nielsen SoundScan.

Bonus edition DVD
A special edition of the CD was released, with an alternate cover, and a bonus DVD consisting of the following:
"Welcome Home" music video
"The Suffering" music video
A Favor House Atlantic: The Movie
A Favor House Atlantic: Bloopers
In the Studio
Animated Vignettes

Graphic novel

A graphic novel entitled Good Apollo, I'm Burning Star IV, Volume One: From Fear Through the Eyes of Madness—illustrated by Christopher Shy—was released in September 2005 along with the album of the same name. The story of From Fear Through the Eyes of Madness takes a step outside the science fiction narrative of the first three chapters and examines the life of The Writer, a character who is crafting the lives of the protagonist Claudio and his companions in the form of a fictional story. Through a series of delusional conversations with his 10-speed bicycle about an unfaithful former lover, The Writer decides he must kill the Prise Ambellina to properly end his story. The events in the narrative itself build up to a final confrontation between Jesse's rebel forces and the Red Army of Supreme Tri-Mage Wilhelm Ryan under the command of General Mayo Deftinwolf, as well as a literal meeting of The Writer and Claudio culminating in the death of Ambellina and Claudio's emergence as The Crowing.

This installment has since been remade and follows the new The Amory Wars series of graphic novels. Claudio Sanchez stated that much was lost from the original graphic novel because of financial constraints. He further explained that although Christopher Shy's art is beautiful, it was not the best medium for the album's storytelling.

Personnel
Primary musicians
 Claudio Sanchez – lead and backing vocals; rhythm/lead guitars; keyboards; piano
 Travis Stever – lead/rhythm guitars; lap steel guitar; mandolin; backing vocals
 Michael Todd – bass guitar; backing vocals
 Josh Eppard – drums; keyboards; percussion; programming; backing vocals

Additional musicians
 Danny Louis – keyboards (tracks 5–10 and 15)
 Kara Bullock & Nick Gardner – ukulele
 Chester Brockwell – didgeridoo
 Daniel Sadownick – percussion (tracks 6 and 8)
 Sarah Kathryn Jacobs – backing vocals (tracks 9 and 15)
 Janiris Sanchez (Claudio Sanchez's niece) – child's voice (tracks 2 and 15)
 Kurtis Jungersen – sound effects

Production
 Produced by Michael Birnbaum and Chris Bittner
 Mixed by David Bottrill, with Andy Wallace on "The Suffering"

Charts

References

External links
Official site
 

Coheed and Cambria albums
2005 albums
Good Apollo, I'm Burning Star IV, Volume 1: From Fear Through the Eyes of Madness
Equal Vision Records albums
Rock operas
The Amory Wars
Emo albums by American artists
Progressive metal albums by American artists